Vladimir Vukicevic (born 6 May 1991) is a Norwegian hurdler. He won a silver medal in the 110 metres hurdles at the 2010 World Junior Championships.

He is coached by his father, Petar Vukićević, a 1980 Olympic hurdler. Vladimir's sister, Christina Vukicevic, also competed in the sprint hurdles.

His personal bests are 13.42 seconds in the 110 metres hurdles (+1.7 m/s, La Chaux-de-Fonds 2021) and 7.69 seconds in the 60 metres hurdles (Gothenburg 2013). Both are current Norwegian records.

International competitions

References

1991 births
Living people
Norwegian male hurdlers
Norwegian people of Serbian descent
Serb diaspora sportspeople
Norwegian Athletics Championships winners